Legarda Street is a short street located in Sampaloc district in Manila, Philippines. It crosses through the eastern section of the University Belt area in a generally east–west orientation between the Nagtahan Interchange and the intersection with Nepomuceno Street in Quiapo. It is served by Legarda station of LRT Line 2.

The street was named after Filipino legislator and resident commissioner to the United States, Benito Legarda y Tuason. Historically, its section in Sampaloc was formerly called Calle Alix (after a Real Audiencia of Manila magistrate of the 1860s, José María Alix y Bonache), while its section in Quiapo was formerly called Plaza Santa Ana and Calle Concordia, respectively.

Route
Legarda Street commences at the Nagtahan Interchange as a westward continuation of Magsaysay Boulevard from Santa Mesa. It heads due west, traversing the southern edge of Sampaloc and skirting the northern boundary of San Miguel. After crossing Figueras Street, Legarda bends to the southwest following the course of Estero de San Miguel (San Miguel Creek). It intersects with Recto Avenue–Mendiola Street, wherein the majority of its traffic turn towards Recto Avenue serving as a major continuation westward, and San Rafael Street before terminating and briefly converging with the junction at Nepomuceno Street (formerly Tanduay Street) in Quiapo before it is continued by P. Casal Street towards San Miguel and Ayala Bridge to Ermita on the southern bank of the Pasig River.

Notable establishments on Legarda Street include Arellano University, Santa Catalina College, the main campus of ABE International Business College, San Lorenzo Ruiz Student Catholic Center, Mendiola Theater and the Department of Social Welfare and Development–NCR Office.

Intersections

Landmarks 
From west to east:

 Santa Catalina College
 Arellano University
 ABE International Business College
 Legarda station
 National Teachers College

See also
 Mendiola Street
 Recto Avenue
University Belt

References

Streets in Manila
Sampaloc, Manila